Tepidimonas aquatica is a gram-negative, aerobic, oxidase and catalase-positive thermophilic, rod-shaped, motile bacterium, with one polar flagellum from the genus Tepidimonas, which was isolated from a domestic water tank in Coimbra.

References

External links
Type strain of Tepidimonas aquatica at BacDive -  the Bacterial Diversity Metadatabase

Comamonadaceae
Bacteria described in 2003